Amar Kudin (born 9 August 1992) is an Italian rugby union player who plays as a Hooker. He currently competes for Fiamme Oro in the Top12.

Born in Croatia, Kudin moved to Italy at a young age, spending most of his time at local rugby youths. Amar spent a couple years with Treviso Youth before joining Rugby San Dona on a professional contract. After a few successful seasons, he returned to his old club after Treviso's clearing out of half the team. In 2014–15 Pro12 season, he played for Benetton.

In 2011, Kudin was named in the Italy Under 20 squad.

external list
http://www.espn.co.uk/italy/rugby/player/135396.html
http://www.itsrugby.co.uk/player-22347.html
https://web.archive.org/web/20141113140439/http://www.benettonrugby.it/c1_106/giocatore.ashx?idsm=4_31

References

1992 births
Croatian emigrants to Italy
Croatian rugby union players
Italian rugby union players
Living people
Rugby union hookers
Fiamme Oro Rugby players